The 1952 Cork Senior Football Championship was the 64th staging of the Cork Senior Football Championship since its establishment by the Cork County Board in 1887. 

Collins entered the championship as the defending champions.

On 16 November 1952, Clonakilty won the championship following a 1-04 to 0-04 defeat of Collins in the final. This was their 7th championship title overall and their first title since 1947.

Results

Final

References

Cork Senior Football Championship